Jaime Roos (born November 12, 1953 in Montevideo) is an Uruguayan singer, composer and record producer. In 2000, he won a Silver Condor Award for Best Score Musician in El Amateur. He has French blood from his father's side. His grandfather migrated from Germany at the end of 19th century.

The drums that go through the Barrio Sur, what the radio broadcasts, the music from the 'tablados' in the carnaval, the Beatles and rock have been some of the influences that he had to create a music with personality and his own signature, that came along with the success that he has in his own country and is extending to an international level. These features make him one of the most popular Uruguayan singers, with great record sales and the tickets to his shows sold out.

He lived when he was a kid in a small apartment in the Convención street, meters away from Durazno, corner that he immortalized in one of his most famous songs "Durazno y Convención". His music mixed rock, candombe, milonga, tango and murga, performing the sound of Montevideo. He is a famous supporter of Defensor Sporting, to whose first championship he dedicated one of his most famous songs, "Cometa de La Farola". Among his famous songs are "Brindis por Pierrot", "Amándote" and "Si me voy antes que vos".

Early life 
From a French father, René Roos, and Uruguayan mother Catalina Alejandro, he was born in the Barrio Sur of Montevideo. Music was always present in the Roos family. His uncle, the musician Georges Roos, introduced him to The Beatles and jazz and his mother introduced him to Uruguayan popular music and Latin American music. The first formal instrument that Roos played was a Brazilian giannini that he got from his father. He took some lessons in a Montevideo conservatory before he started high school.

Discography 
 Candombe del 31 (1977)
 Para espantar el sueño (1978)
 Aquello (1981)
 Siempre son las 4 (1982)
 Nunca, nunca (Cassette simple – 1983)
 Mediocampo (1984)
 Mujer de sal junto a un hombre vuelto carbón (Jaime Roos and Estela Magnone )
 Sur (19 8 763)
 Esta noche (Record in "La Barraca" – 1989)
 Estamos rodeados (1991)
 Antología del Candombe (Compilation 1991)
 Cuando juega Uruguay (1992)
 La margarita (Text by Mauricio Rosencof – 1994)
 El puente (1995)
 Si me voy antes que vos (1996)
 Repertorio (EMI-Orfeo – 1997)
 Jaime Roos Te hizo vivir (EMI-Orfeo, select of loves songs – 1998)
 Concierto aniversario (Sony Music, record in Teatro Solís – 1998)
 Primeras paginas (EMI-Orfeo Recompilation 1/6 – 2000)
 Siempre son las cuatro / Mediocampo (EMI-Orfeo Recompilation 2/6 – 2000)
 Estamos rodeados / La margarita (EMI-Orfeo Recompilation 4/6 -2000)
 El puente (EMI-Orfeo Recompilation 5/6, to the original disc of 1995, add four song, of the period 1978–1982 – 2000)
 Contraseña (2000)
 Candombe, Murga y Rockanroll (2002)
 Serie de Oro: Grandes Exitos (2005)
 Fuera de Ambiente (2006)
 Hermano te Estoy Hablando (2009)
 Cine Metropol: Canciones escritas o versionadas para cine, teatro y TV (2013, MMG)
 En vivo en el Río de la Plata: Antología 2008-2013 (2014)
 Jaime Roos Obra Completa: Candombe del 31, Para espantar el sueño, Aquello, Siempre son las cuatro, Mediocampo (2015, Bizarro)
 Jaime Roos Obra Completa: Mujer de sal junto a un hombre vuelto carbón, 7 y 3, Sur, Esta noche (2016, Bizarro)
 Jaime Roos Obra Completa: Estamos rodeados, La Margarita, El Puente, Selladas 1 1983-1992 (2016, Bizarro)

References

External links
 

1953 births
Living people
Uruguayan guitarists
Uruguayan male guitarists
Uruguayan songwriters
Male songwriters
Uruguayan musicians
Uruguayan people of French descent
Recipients of the Delmira Agustini Medal